Richard Ben Sapir (1936–1987) is best known for The Destroyer series of novels that he co-created with Warren Murphy.

The first Destroyer was written in 1963, while Sapir worked as a city hall reporter in Jersey City and Murphy served as secretary to the city's mayor. Ahead of its time with a plot centered upon a brash young westerner trained in the martial arts by a master assassin from North Korea, the book went unpublished until June 1971 but eventually spawned a highly successful adventure series with over 30 million copies in print by the late 1990s.

Prior to co-creating The Destroyer, Sapir worked as an editor and in public relations. In addition to The Destroyer series, Sapir wrote five novels:  Bressio (1975), The Far Arena (1978), The Body (1983), Spies (1984), and Quest (1987), a modern-day search for the Holy Grail. The Body, which was made into a movie in 2001, is about a Jewish archaeologist who finds a skeleton underneath an Arab shopkeeper's basement that might be the body of Jesus and the American Jesuit priest who is sent by the Vatican to investigate.

Richard Sapir was a graduate of Columbia University and lived with his wife in New Hampshire until his death in 1987 from a heart attack.

References

External links

1936 births
1987 deaths
20th-century American novelists
Columbia University alumni
American male novelists
20th-century American male writers
Writers from New York City
Novelists from New York (state)